

History 

The Universidad Politécnica de Cartagena is the youngest technical university in Spain. This fact is contrasted, however, by its long history as a university in the engineering and business fields, as several of its faculties date back to the late 19th and early 20th-century.

UPCT lies within an urban area where most of its facilities are in restored historic buildings, such as the Navy Hospital (Spanish: Hospital de Marina) (18th-century), the Headquarters of Antiguones (Spanish: el Cuartel de Antigones) (18th-century), the House of Mercy (Spanish: Casa de Misericordia) (19th-century) and the Headquarters for Marine Training (Spanish: Cuartel de Instrucción de Marinería) (18th-century).

The establishment of the Polytechnic School of Cartagena dates back to 1975 and came about when the studies were integrated into the University of Murcia. The aim was to integrate the Technical School of Mining Engineering and the Technical School of Industrial Engineering into the University of Murcia and be able to add other areas of study to the new Center.

In 1998, on the basis of the faculties and degrees taught at the Cartagena campus, the Universidad Politécnica de Cartagena was established.

The first school was the School of Mines (currently Faculties of Civil and Mining Engineering, EICM), established in 1883. This was followed by the School of Industry (currently ETSII) in 1901, the School of Business Studies (currently FCCE) in 1921, the School of Naval Engineering (currently ETSINO) in 1977, the School of  Agricultural Engineering (currently ETSIA) in 1993, the Faculty of Telecommunications Engineering (ETSIT) in 1998, and finally, the Faculty of Arquitecture and Building (ETSAE) in 2008.

The studies offered by the UPCT and the University of Murcia complement each other. Both Universities make up the International Excellence Campus for Higher Education and Research called 'Mare Nostrum'. Furthermore, UPCT is a member of the UP4 association, together with the Technical Universities of Madrid, Catalonia and Valencia.

The Universidad Politécnica de Cartagena is one of the eight holders of the European University of Technology (EUt+) with the Technical University of Sofia, the Cyprus University of Technology, the Hochschule Darmstadt, University of Applied Sciences), the Technological University Dublin, the Riga Technical University, the University of Technology of Troyes and the Technical University of Cluj-Napoca.

The European University of Technology (EUt+) is the result of the alliance of eight European partners who share in common :the "Think Human First" vision towards a human-centred approach to technology and the ambition to establish a new type of institution on a confederal basis.

Through EUt+, the partners are committed to creating a sustainable future for students and learners in European countries, for the staff of each of the institutions and for the territories and regions where each campus is anchored.

Campus 

The UPCT has three urban campuses located in the center of Cartagena. This city has been revitalised by restoring several 18th-century military buildings. Around these buildings and facing the port of the city, a university quarter has been created with research facilities, student accommodation, new services, leisure time activities and a student community. 
 Campus Alfonso XIII, located in the city center, was the first Campus to be established. There we find the Faculty of Agricultural Engineering (ETSIA), the Faculty of Naval and Oceanic Engineering (ETSINO) and Civil and Mining Engineering (EICM).
 Campus Muralla del Mar consists of the old Navy Hospital, which is the seat of the Faculty of Industrial Engineering (ETSII), and the old Antigones Military Headquarters, where the Faculty of Telecommunications Engineering (ETSIT) is situated. Within this campus we can also find the R&D building, the Technology Research Support Service (Spanish: Servicio de Apoyo a la Investigación Tecnológica, SAIT), the Institute of Plant Biotechnology (Spanish: Instituto de Biotecnología Vegetal, IBV), the Technology and Information Systems Center (Spanish: Centro de Tecnología y Sistemas de Información, CTSI) and the Research Laboratory Building (Spanish: Edificio de Laboratorios de Investigación, ELDI), which hosts the Network of Chairs and The Student House.
 Campus CIM is an old headquarters for Marine Training. This campus hosts the Faculty of Economic and Business Science (Spanish: Facultad de Ciencias de la Empresa, FCCE) and the Faculty of Architecture and Building (ETSAE).

Faculties 

 Faculty of Agricultural Engineering (Spanish: Escuela Técnica Superior de Ingeniería Agronómica, ETSIA).
 Faculty of Industrial Engineering (Spanish: Escuela Técnica Superior de Ingeniería Industrial, ETSII)..
 Faculty of Naval and Oceanic Engineering (Spanish: Escuela Técnica Superior de Ingeniería Naval y Oceánica, ETSINO).
 Faculty of Telecommunications Engineering (Spanish: Escuela Técnica Superior de Ingeniería de Telecomunicación, ETSIT
 Faculty of Economic and Business Science (Spanish: Facultad de Ciencias de la Empresa, FCCE).
 Faculty of Architecture and Building (Spanish: Escuela Técnica Superior de Arquitectura y Edificación, ETSAE).
 Faculty of Civil Engineering and Mining (Spanish: Escuela Universitaria de Ingeniería de Caminos, Canales y Puertos y de Ingeniería de Minas, EICM).
 Military University Center (Spanish: Centro Universitario de la Defensa, CUD), associated public centre.

Network of Chairs 
The Network of Chairs at the Universidad Politécnica de Cartagena is divided into technology, and socioeconomic chairs. All of them carry out training, research and development activities, as well as exchanges of knowledge in areas of common interest. The Network of Chairs was initiated as a tool to strengthen relations between the University and local, national and multinational companies, and as a way of linking higher education and companies, connecting knowledge to a productive framework.

Internship programmes for students, R&D projects involving the University and companies, training programs, promotion of internships, the presenting of academic awards and outreach sessions are the main activities developed within the UPCT Network of Chairs, which is made up of big multinational companies, large factories located in the region of Cartagena as well as technological start-ups.

The Network of Chairs covers more than 16,000 ft2, an area assigned to the companies inside the University with their commitment to developing R&D activities and to offering internships to  students in their final years. In most cases, these Chairs are located in the Innovation Laboratory Building (Spanish: Edificio de Laboratorios de Innovación, ELDI). The ELDI building is located in the Campus Muralla del Mar, near the Faculty of Telecommunications Engineering and the Faculty of Industrial Engineering, and a few metres from the Port of Cartagena. This location provides facilities for meetings and leisure, which makes for a working environment where interaction and innovation are possible. Furthermore, some Chairs are placed inside the Faculties in order to bring the students and the companies closer together.

Next to the Network of Chairs, in the ELDI building, the UPCT has a Digital Content Production Centre (Spanish: Centro de Producciones Digitales, CPCD) for the creation of and experimentation with digital contents such as digital image processing, audio-visual production and post-production, 3D analysis and treatment, 2D animation, media integration, polymedia services, on-line streaming broadcasts and distance e-learning.

Engineering Campus 

Another objective of the UPCT is to promote technological knowledge and support vocational training. The Scientific Culture and Innovation Unit, included in the Spanish Foundation for Science and Technology, organizes the Engineering Campus Fair. Every year, thousands of students attend to learn from science experiments and demonstrations carried out by University researchers, teachers from secondary schools and technological-based companies. The Engineering Campus provides a venue for the dissemination, communication and promotion of scientific and technological knowledge, in which the main actors are students from pre-school, primary and secondary schools, with their teachers, who voluntarily participate in the training activities carried out by the Teachers and Resources Center in the Region of Murcia (CARM). The projects developed at schools are based on different disciplines such as Physics, Chemistry, Mathematics, Biology, Geology, Technology or Technical Drawing, which are key areas to the courses taught at the UPCT.

Governing and representative bodies 
The governing and representative bodies are:
 Management Team and Vice-Rectors offices
 Governing Council
 Social Council
 University Ombudsman
 PAS Committee
 PDI Committee
 Council
 Student Council (students)

Doctors Honoris Causa 
 Arturo Pérez-Reverte, granted on 18 February 2004.
 Manuel Albaladejo, granted on 23 June 2005.
 Justo Nieto Nieto, granted on 23 June 2005.
 Antonio Fernández Alba, granted on 26 January 2007.
 Yoshihito Osada, granted on 8 November 2007.
 Vinton Cerf, granted on 17 April 2008.
 Rafael Rebolo López, granted on 17 April 2008.
 Gustavo V. Barbosa-Cánovas, granted on 29 April 2010.
 Adel A. Kader, granted on 20 April 2010.
 Adela Cortina, granted on 27 January 2012.
 Juan Miguel Villar Mir, granted on 28 January 2013.
 Rainer Gadow, granted on 28 January 2014.

References

External links 

 
 UPCT Twitter profile
 UPCT Facebook page
 International Campus of Excellence Mare Nostrum
 UPCT Summer courses
 Faculty of Agricultural Engineering
 Faculty of Industrial Engineering
 Faculty of Naval and Oceanic Engineering
 Faculty of Telecommunication Engineeringn
 Faculty of Economic and Business Science
 Faculty of Civil and Mining Engineering
 Faculty of Architecture and Building
 International School of Doctoral Studies
 Network of Chairs
 Engineering Campus
 Digital Content Production Centre
 Student Council

Universities and colleges in Spain
Education in the Region of Murcia
Buildings and structures in Cartagena, Spain